Van Rensselaer Potter II (August 27, 1911 – September 6, 2001) was  an American biochemist, oncologist, and bioethicist. Born in northeast South Dakota, Potter was professor of oncology at the McArdle Laboratory for Cancer Research at the University of Wisconsin–Madison for more than five decades.

Potter is known for coining the widely used term bioethics in 1970, however, German theologian Fritz Jahr had previously coined the term in the 1920s. Peter Whitehouse describes Potter's formulation of bioethics as a "wise integration of biology and values", which arose from his work as a cancer researcher and from the influence of faculty member Aldo Leopold at the University of Wisconsin. 

Bioethics is linked to environmental ethics and is separate from biomedical ethics. Because of this confusion (and appropriation of the term in medicine), Potter chose to use the term global bioethics in 1988. He was an elected member of the [[National Academy of
Sciences]], The president of the American Society of Cell Biology in 1965, and the president of the American Association for Cancer Research in 1974.

Awards 
 Bristol-Myers Squibb Awards (1981)
 Pfizer Award in Enzyme Chemistry (1947)
 List of Ten Outstanding Young Americans (1945)

Publications

Popular

 Bioethics: Bridge to the Future (Prentice-Hall, 1971)
 Global Bioethics: Building on the Leopold Legacy (Michigan State Univ Pr 1988)

See also 

 Geotherapy

References

Further reading
 Lower, G. (2001). Van Rensselaer Potter—Ad memoriam. Global Bioethics, 14(4), 31–32. Retrieved May 15, 2021.
 Whitehouse, P. J. (2002). Van Rensselaer Potter: An Intellectual Memoir. Cambridge Quarterly of Healthcare Ethics, 11(4), 331–334.  Retrieved May 15, 2021.

1911 births
2001 deaths
American biochemists
People from South Dakota
Global ethics
Cancer researchers